Tom Van Sickle (June 22, 1937 – July 3, 2016) was an American politician who served as the Treasurer of Kansas from 1973 to 1975. He previously served in Kansas House of Representatives from 1959 to 1961 and in the Kansas Senate from 1961 to 1973.

He died on July 3, 2016, in Olathe, Kansas at age 79.

References

1937 births
2016 deaths
Republican Party members of the Kansas House of Representatives
Republican Party Kansas state senators
State treasurers of Kansas